Sitiveni O. Mafi (born 9 December 1989) is a Tongan rugby union player. He plays in the lock and occasionally flanker position for the English Premiership Rugby side, London Irish. Mafi also represents Tonga at international level.

Mafi previously played for the Leicester Tigers and New South Wales Waratahs. Mafi played as a replacement during the 2013 Premiership final as Leicester defeated Northampton Saints. In the final of the 2017–18 Top 14 season he scored a try after coming on as a replacement as Castres defeated Montpellier.

He is the grandson of former Tonga captain Sione Mafi Pahulu. He attended Westfields Sports High School and played his Junior rugby at Parramatta Two Blues in Sydneys west. In 2007 he played for the Australian Schoolboys.

Super Rugby statistics

Honours

Club 
 Leicester Tigers
Premiership Rugby: 2012–13
 Castres
Top 14: 2017–18

References

External links
ARU profile
 
 

Living people
1989 births
Australian rugby union players
Tongan expatriate sportspeople in England
Tonga international rugby union players
Leicester Tigers players
Greater Sydney Rams players
Rugby union locks
Australian sportspeople of Tongan descent
Australian expatriate rugby union players
Expatriate rugby union players in England
Expatriate rugby union players in France
Australian expatriate sportspeople in England
Western Force players
Castres Olympique players
Rugby union players from Sydney